Hedong Subdistrict is a subdistrict and the seat of Xihu District, Benxi, Liaoning, People's Republic of China. , it has nine residential communities under its administration.

See also
List of township-level divisions of Liaoning

References

Township-level divisions of Liaoning
Benxi